KIBLA or Kibla is the first multimedia and multidisciplinary art production facility in Slovenia, as well as a year-long cultural program. Kibla uses different media to maintain historical continuities in visual arts and integration of electronic and traditional media. It also incorporates classical (original) media in different contexts. It is a member of the Slavic Culture Forum. Kibla displays, distributes, and promotes the activity of 16 multimedia centers around Slovenia.

Ace Kibla programmes
 Cyber, provides free internet access as well as free internet-related courses via website architecture, programs, and hardware.SRCe - Student Resource Centre – provides information on study opportunities, national and international scholarship foundations, publications, and mediates inquiries using an extensive online database. 
 KiBela, is a multipurpose room suited for seminars, presentations, lectures, round tables, press conferences, and a diverse cultural program, as well as a space for visual and intermedia art; ambiental displays of modern multimedia art.
 Hidden Notes (Skrite note) -is a musical series that features concerts, projections, talks, and workshops including electroacoustic music.
 IT@K – IT at Kibla – it is an Online and multimedia lab for the development of websites, CD-ROMs, video, audio, and real-time internet transmissions, among other things.As a social event, information technology CGP is a graphic design studio that specializes in the creation of printed materials. 
 Videla – digital video processing, education, courses, presentations and workshops.
 Za:misel (For:thought) bookstore for sociology and humanistic studies with regular program of book presentations and literary evenings; with a reading room equipped with national and foreign literature, newspapers and periodicals.
 Mimogrede (By The Way) – bimonthly with information about studying abroad and in Slovenia.
 LED display for all information about MMC KIBLA and programmes;
 TOX magazine – time-table through 3000, magazine (from 1995) that grew into the KIBLA publishing edition (from 1998), made several catalogues and books, e.g. Eduardo Kac: Telepresence, Biotelematics, Transgenic Art, Vili Ravnjak: The Amber way, Aleksandra Kostič's edited essays on Levitation, catalogues for Marko Jakše, Marko Črtanec, Mitjja Ficko, Theo Botscuijver, Shuzo Azuchi Gulliver, several CDs (Nino Mureškič, Vasko Atanasovski, Siti hlapci and CD-ROMs (for EU project European Multimedia Accelerator- EMMA) and DVDs for EU project txoOm.
 Communication-information point KIT in Maribor City Hall (Rotovž), Glavni trg 14, where there are eight computer terminals and a multimedia classroom with ten computers and additional IT equipment.

Festivals
 Day of Curiosity - Annual educational festival connecting schools, pupils, students, teachers, professors with professionals, with workshops on career choices.
 Izzven – a three-day international contemporary music festival that incorporates international collaborations projects.
 Kiblix – IT Linux festival - Festival about Open Source consists of topics such as mobile technologies, open source, security on the Internet and Linux.

Special programs
 Committee for Vine Service – degustations, education, information service, excursions.

International cooperation
In 1999, Kibla was covered in Leonardo (MIT Press) and Flash Art and on numerous web-zines, i.e. California On-Line and in all-important Slovenian media, from newspapers and magazines to radio and TV and web.

Kibla is working on the EC-Culture 2000 (txOom, TransArtDislocated, Soziale Geraeusche and Virtual Centre Media Net are finished), FP5-IST (EMMA – European Multimedia Accelerator) and FP6-IST (PATENT – Partnership for Telecommunication New Technologies) funded programmes and projects. Kibla is also a part of the EUREKA multimedia umbrella, and finished Leonardo da Vinci supported project Name multimedia, the Multimedia Tasks & Skills Database, researching and evaluating 26 different jobs and 96 operational multimedia tasks. NAME is presented in 9 languages, with a database of more than 650 companies from 11 countries.

In 2005 KIBLA was with other partners again successful on EU-Culture 2000 and finished 2 new projects: e-Agora, which developed a virtual multimedia platform for innovative production and presentation of Performing Arts and will use the latest communication technologies (multi-user shared environments on the Internet) in order to interconnect European theatres, cultural centres, and enhance their co-operation; and TRG – Transient reality generators (http://fo.am/trg/), that focuses on the phenomenon of Mixed Reality (environments containing significant virtual and physical interaction possibilities, strongly intertwined) and examines the potential of synaesthetic MR experience design, in which the art-works become all-encompassing art-worlds. KIBLA was 3 years in a row (2001, 2002, 2003) the most successful Slovenian cultural institution and organization internationally.

See also
 Opace
 NKPR Inc

References

External links
Official Kibla webpage

Top Cultural European Holiday Destinations

Medi@terra Art and Technology Festival, Athens - Electronic Literature Organization

Za:misel bookstore
Hidden notes
KiBar: cybernetic bar
Communication information point KIT
Videla
TOX
IT@K
Mimogrede - By The Way newspaper

Arts centres in Slovenia
Non-profit organizations based in Slovenia
Organizations established in 1996
Digital media organizations